is a Japanese professional female road racing and track cyclist. She represented Japan at the 2020 Summer Olympics, and won a silver medal in the women's omnium, becoming the first Japanese woman to win an Olympic medal in cycling.

Career 
As a junior, she competed on the road in the junior events at the 2015 UCI Road World Championships and 2014 UCI Road World Championships. She won the gold medal in the scratch and the silver medal in the team pursuit at the 2016 Asian Cycling Championships. She is the reigning world champion in Women's omnium, having won gold in 2020.

Career results
2016
Asian Track Championships
1st  Scratch Race
2nd  Team Pursuit (with Kisato Nakamura, Sakura Tsukagoshi and Minami Uwano
Track Clubs ACC Cup
1st Omnium
1st Points race
1st Team Sprint (With Takako Ishii)
2nd Scratch race
1st Omnium, Japan Track Cup
2017
Asian Track Championships
1st  Omnium
1st  Points Race
2nd  Individual Pursuit
3rd  Madison (with Kie Furuyama)
National Track Championships
1st  Individual Pursuit
1st  Points Race

References

External links

1997 births
Living people
Japanese track cyclists
Japanese female cyclists
Sportspeople from Saitama Prefecture
Asian Games medalists in cycling
Cyclists at the 2018 Asian Games
Medalists at the 2018 Asian Games
Asian Games gold medalists for Japan
Asian Games bronze medalists for Japan
UCI Track Cycling World Champions (women)
Cyclists at the 2020 Summer Olympics
Olympic cyclists of Japan
Olympic medalists in cycling
Olympic silver medalists for Japan
Medalists at the 2020 Summer Olympics
21st-century Japanese women